Henry Wheeler Lloyd Nicholson (1832 – 20 January 1858) was an English cricketer. Nicholson's batting and bowling styles are unknown.

Nicholson made his first-class debut for Sussex against Nottinghamshire in 1853. He made ten further first-class appearances for Sussex, the last of which came against Kent in 1855. In his eleven first-class appearances for the county, he scored 272 runs at an average of 14.31, with a high score of 41. Nicholson also played first-class cricket for a handful of other teams. He played three matches for the Gentlemen of England, two matches for the Surrey Club (who he took his five first-class wickets for), and a match each for the South of England and a United England Eleven.

Nicholson died on the Mediterranean island of Malta on 20 January 1858.

References

External links

Henry Nicholson at ESPNcricinfo
Henry Nicholson at CricketArchive

1832 births
1858 deaths
English cricketers
Sussex cricketers
United All-England Eleven cricketers
Surrey Club cricketers
Gentlemen cricketers
North v South cricketers
English cricketers of 1826 to 1863
Gentlemen of England cricketers